The International Cavaliers were an ad hoc cricket team made up of famous cricketers in order to encourage local cricket. Their teams included many prominent cricketers from the 1940s, 1950s, 1960s and 1970s as many retired veterans and talented young players were in the team at one point or another. International tours were arranged to South Africa in 1960–61, Africa and India in 1962–63 and the West Indies in 1964–65, 1965–66 and 1969–70. These were usually made up of Test players whose countries were not touring that season (a more common occurrence at the time) or who were not required for their Test side.

History
In England from 1965 to 1968 Denis Compton and Godfrey Evans arranged 40-over one-day games for the International Cavaliers made up of international and local players against county teams on Sundays, which at the time were always rest days in Test matches and the County Championship. The BBC showed the games on television, providing extra revenue, and the games allowed spectators to see a wide range of famous players at county grounds. In the first season they drew 280,000 spectators, compared to 327,000 on the other six days of the week. Ted Dexter wrote, "We had such an amazing side – Sobers, Compton, Graeme Pollock – I was only able to creep in at 6 or 7. When we went to Lord's for the first time we told them to be ready, there'd be a big crowd. They said 'No, no, there won't'. They sold out of everything by twelve. We took the place by storm."

In 1966 they beat the touring West Indies cricket team by 21 runs, with Compton making 43 and Trevor Bailey taking 3/41, and again by 7 wickets, with Dexter taking 2/42 and making 104, and in 1969 they defeated New Zealand by 38 runs. They also played various other teams, such as the Rest of the World XI, Duke of Norfolk's XI, F.S Trueman's XI, E.R. Dexter's XI and Oxford University Past and Present. They were a financial success and their popularity with the fans led to the increase of limited overs cricket in England. As a result the MCC devised their own limited overs competition, but as the BBC were happy showing the Cavaliers they had to ban county cricketers from playing to get the television rights and a sponsor. After several lawsuits the John Player County League began in 1969, and the Cavaliers were disbanded in 1970.

Players

Further reading
 Ted Dexter and Ian Wooldrige, The International Cavaliers' World of Cricket, Purnell, 1970
 Terence Crosby, "The International Cavaliers 1965–1968", The Cricket Statistician, Summer 2018, pp. 14–21

See also
World Series Cricket Cavaliers XI

Notes

First-class cricket teams